h.IV+ (Hoarse Industrial Viremia) is the fifth studio album by Finnish industrial experimental black metal band, Havoc Unit (based on including their albums with their former name, ...and Oceans). The industrial elements of this album, while not as evident as in their previous albums, are present.

The first song's Arabic title can be transliterated Mbyd (pesticide) Aldydan (worms), meaning vermicide.

Track listing

Personnel
 sa.myel (Sami Latva) – drums, bass, guitars (All in Me, Deathbound, Ghost Guard, O, Rotten Sound)
 t.kunz – guitars, bass (O, Deathbound)
 jos.f – vocals (O, (SIC), Irene's Kunt, Extreme Disco Terror, Peacefrog)
 heinr.ich – keys (O, (SIC), Kinetik Control, The Sin:Decay, Kyprian's Circle, Black Dawn (Fin), The True Black Dawn)

Havoc Unit albums
2007 albums